Eusebio Unzué Labiano (born 26 February 1955 in Orcoyen, Navarra) is the team manager of UCI WorldTeam .

 is a continuation of the former Banesto cycling team, where Unzué was also the team manager. He helped José María Jiménez, Pedro Delgado and Miguel Indurain to their many victories, especially in the Tour de France.

He is the brother of former footballer and assistant manager of FC Barcelona Juan Carlos Unzué and the uncle of racing cyclist Enrique Sanz.

References

External links

Cassie d'Epargne official website

Spanish sportspeople
Living people
1955 births
Directeur sportifs
People from Cuenca de Pamplona
Movistar Team (men's team)
Sportspeople from Navarre